Catwalk is a Canadian musical drama series that ran for 49 episodes on the YTV network from 1992 until 1994. The series' first season aired in syndication in the United States, while the second season aired on MTV.

Synopsis 
The series was based around six twenty-something adults who formed a band named Catwalk. The episodes centered on the band's personal relationships and struggles to land a record deal, while also featuring their musical performances in nightclubs. Their main gathering place was a downtown loft.

Singer/guitarist Johnnie Camden (Keram Malicki-Sanchez) was at the focus of the show; it was in his loft where the band gathered to rehearse. Relationships were also a major part of the show; there were two couples within the cast, as Daisy (Neve Campbell) dated the group's manager Billy K., and Mary (Kelli Taylor) dated the drummer Jesse (Paul Popowich). The relationship was tumultuous and the couple broke up before the end of the first season.

The show had a somewhat post-apocalyptic flavour, with Blade Runner-style burning oil barrels, dark and ambient lighting, and flashing white lights that pass through blinds, giving the show a futuristic look.

The second season featured a new character, Maggi (Nicole de Boer), who in the first season (in the episode "Toxic Love") became briefly involved with lead guitarist Johnnie Camden, causing tension within the band.

Cast and characters 
 Lisa Butler as Sierra Williams, the strong-willed lead singer. After watching Johnnie and Mary's performance, she leaves a "clue" in their audition tapes, hoping they find her. Sierra works for Master Sound Records and used to date a guy named Tyrone who's actually a separatist for black people; she would take over keyboards in addition to singing after Daisy left during the second season
 Neve Campbell as Daisy McKenzie, the naïve keyboard player who used to date Johnnie and later ends up with Billy K. She almost married to a man named Eric, as she feels she has no one without her parents alive. (first season only)
 Christopher Lee Clements as Addie "Atlas" Robinson, the tough-guy rapper and dancer who used to work for Billy K to look after his aunt Ellen. He had a troubled past involving his father dying in a crossfire, with a difficulty in letting go. (first season only)
 Keram Malicki-Sanchez as Johnnie Camden, the fiercely driven leader and guitarist. He names his guitar "Watson". Johnnie moves out from his father, living in a loft with Jesse as his roommate. His mother Rita left him and his dad years ago. (first season only)
 Paul Popowich as Jesse Carlson, the band's drummer who has rebelled against his wealthy family to live on his own terms. He moves into the loft as Johnnie’s roommate He also plays guitar & piano/keyboards.
 Kelli Taylor as Mary Owens, the sensitive but tough bassist and background singer. She is a childhood friend of Johnnie’s and Daisy's. In the second season she, along with Jesse, would take control of the band after Johnnie.
 J. H. Wyman as Billy K, the band's manager, a nightclub owner with shady dealings
 David Lee Russek as Frank Cafla, an alcoholic singer with a great voice (second season only)
 Nicole de Boer as Maggie Holden, an ex-girlfriend of Johnnie's and later girlfriend for Billy-K after Daisy left (second season; however she did appear in a first season episode titled "Toxic Love")
 Rob Stefaniuk as Benny Doulon, a guitarist who took Johnnie's place in the band (second season only)

Minor characters 
 Victor Ertmanis as Eddie Camden: Johnnie's father who works on his boat and doesn't approve of his son in music due to carrying the hurt of his wife leaving him and Johnnie. And yet despite that, tries to support his son in what he loves and with the band.
 Johnie Chase and Brenda Bazinet as Joe and Julia Owens: Mary's father and mother who shared their love of music to her as a child and support her in the band.
 Jackie Richardson as Aunt Ellen Robinson: Atlas' aunt who runs a shop, who looked after him after his father died.
 Linda Griffiths as Rita: Johnnie’s mother who left him and her ex-husband when Johnnie was young. She revisits to see Johnnie and explain why she left.
 Yannick Bisson as Nick: One of Mary's friends and Daisy's ex-boyfriends, who contracted HIV.
 Christina Cox as Suzie: One of Atlas' ex-girlfriends who got pregnant at a senior year. Due to child neglect, she was forced to give her up and be sent to foster care.
 Réal Andrews as Tyrone: A sound engineer who Sierra used to date. She thought he was a nice man, but is racial between blacks and whites; including towards Atlas who's a "sellout". Sierra ends up breaking up with Tyrone, when she brings Catwalk for the benefit.

Episodes

Season 1 (1992–93)

Season 2

Music 
The first season music was done by Rupert Gayle and Orin Isaacs.  The second season on MTV was done by Steve Tyrell (The Heights and California Dreams) and his late wife, Stephanie Tyrell (also The Heights).  A soundtrack from the second season was released on Atlantic Records and also featured performances, in addition to "Catwalk" (series star Lisa Butler and singer Barry Coffing as the singing role of Frank Cafla), from former The Heights star Jamie Walters, Vonda Shepard, Buffalo Tom, The Lemonheads, and Intro.

1994 Soundtrack 

Track Listing
 If You Want Me
 Life is Sweet
 I'm Allowed-Buffalo Tom (Produced by The Robb Brothers with Buffalo Tom) (from the album Big Red Letter Day)
 Drive Me-Jamie Walters (from the album Jamie Walters)
 Let Me Off Here
 Something to Cry About
 Ribbon in the Sky (single edit) (cover of the song by Stevie Wonder)-Intro (Produced by Nevelle Hodge) (from the album Intro)
 Reckless (this song was later sung by Jamie Walters and appeared on an episode of Beverly Hills 90210; the Walters' version would also turn up on his second album Ride)
 It's About Time-The Lemonheads (Produced by The Robb Brothers and Evan Dando) (from the album Come On Feel The Lemonheads)
 Love Is A Dream (featuring Vonda Shepard)
 You Hurt Me

Tracks 1–2, 5, 8, and 11 lead vocals by Barry Coffing 
Track 6 lead vocals by Lisa Butler

 Cancellation 
The first season of Catwalk was rerun on YTV in Canada for four consecutive years.  Season one comprised 24 episodes. The majority of the second season episodes were never aired due to a licensing conflict between MTV Networks and the original creator of the show, Adam Kidron, and remain unseen.

 In popular culture 
 In 1992, a Connecticut-based band also named Catwalk sued over the right to use the name.

 Award and nominations 

 See also 

 The Heights''

References

External links 
 The Great Canadian Guide to the Movies & TV
 

1990s Canadian drama television series
1990s Canadian music television series
1992 Canadian television series debuts
1994 Canadian television series endings
English-language television shows
First-run syndicated television programs in the United States
Television series by Claster Television
Television shows filmed in Toronto
YTV (Canadian TV channel) original programming